Cornesia ormoperla is a species of moth of the family Tortricidae. It is found in Zambia, Zimbabwe, Nigeria, South Africa and the Democratic Republic of the Congo.

The length of the forewings is 7–8 mm. The ground colour of the forewings is orange yellow suffused with orange brown. The pattern is dark orange brown, consisting of a series of costal spots and terminal suffusion. There are transverse rows of large groups of erect scales and several rounded refractive spots. The hindwings are brownish, mixed with orange, but paler basally.

References

Moths described in 1981
Tortricini
Insects of the Democratic Republic of the Congo
Lepidoptera of West Africa
Lepidoptera of Zambia
Insects of Zimbabwe
Moths of Africa
Taxa named by Józef Razowski